The 2019 Ondo State House of Assembly election was held on March 9, 2019, to elect members of the Ondo State House of Assembly in Nigeria. All the 26 seats were up for election in the Ondo State House of Assembly.

Bamidele Oleyelogun from APC representing Ifedore constituency was elected Speaker, while Ogundeji Iroju from APC representing Odigbo I constituency was elected Deputy Speaker.

Results 
The result of the election is listed below.

 Rasheed Elegbeleye from PDP won Akoko North East constituency
 Festus Akingbaso from PDP won Idanre constituency
 Tomide Akinribido from ZLP won Ondo West I constituency
 Bamidele Oleyelogun from APC won Ifedore constituency
 Ogundeji Iroju from APC won Odigbo I constituency
 Jamiu Maito from APC won Akoko North-West I constituency
 Kuti Towase from APC won Akoko South East constituency
 Oluwole Emmanuel Ogunmolasuyi from APC won Owo I constituency
 Adeyemi Olayemi from APC won Owo II constituency
 Oluyede Feyide from APC won Ose constituency
 Sunday Olajide from APC won Akure South II constituency
 Felemu-Gudu Bankole from APC won Akoko South-West II constituency
 Toluwani Borokinni from APC won Akure South I constituency
 Aderoboye Samuel  from APC won Odigbo II constituency
 Olugbenga Omole Akinola from APC won Akoko South-West I constituency
 Mohammed Taofik Oladele from APC won Akoko North West II constituency
 Abiodun Faleye from APC won Akure North constituency
 Torhukerhijo Success Taiwo from APC won Ese-Odo constituency
 Akinruntan Abayomi from APC won Ilaje I constituency
 Tomomewo Favour Semilore from APC won Ilaje II constituency
 Adefiranye Ayodele Festus from APC won Ileoluji/Okeigbo constituency
 Ademola Samuel Edamisan from APC won Irele constituency
 Akinrogunde Akintomide from APC won Okitipupa I constituency
 Akinwumi Sina Emmanuel from APC won Okitipupa II constituency
 Williams Adewinle Adewale from APC won Ondo West II constituency
 Oladiji Adesanmi from APC won Ondo East constituency

References 

Ondo
Ondo State elections